Christiana is a settlement in Jamaica. The town was originally called Struan Castle. During the early days of British colonial rule, it was a popular destination for British citizens due to the cool climate and the sometimes foggy weather.

Notable people
 Roger Cross, actor  are originally from this settlement.
 Lila Iké, singer and musician
 Byron Lee, musician

References

Populated places in Manchester Parish